Thopomyia is a genus of flies in the family Stratiomyidae.

Species
Thopomyia dentata (James, 1967)
Thopomyia dichroa Kertész, 1916
Thopomyia jamesi (Lindner, 1967)
Thopomyia kerteszi James, 1974
Thopomyia pallipes (Lindner, 1951)

References

Stratiomyidae
Brachycera genera
Taxa named by Kálmán Kertész
Diptera of South America